The 1993–94 season was Sport Lisboa e Benfica's 90th season in existence and the club's 60th consecutive season in the top flight of Portuguese football. It involved Benfica competing in the Primeira Divisão and the Taça de Portugal. Benfica qualified for the European Cup Winners' Cup by winning previous Portuguese Cup. It covers the period between 1 July 1993 to 30 June 1994.

The season was marked by the events in his pre-season, as the club only made three signings. More importantly, however, the club lost regular starter Paulo Sousa and common substitute António Pacheco to Sporting CP due to unpaid salaries. Expectations around Benfica were not high, as Sporting and Porto were deemed the main contenders. After a poor start, however, a six-game winning streak granted them the top position in the league table. After going 15 league games unbeaten, a loss in April at Salgueiros and a draw at home against Estrela da Amadora made it necessary to win at the Estádio José Alvalade to retain their first-place position; a hat-trick from João Pinto in a 6–3 win put the title only six points away. On 25 May, a win over Gil Vicente ended the title race, with the club winning a record 30th league title.

Season summary
The season that celebrated its 90th anniversary was also one of the club most tumultuous periods in recent history. In the summer, Paulo Sousa, João Pinto and António Pacheco unilaterally terminated their contracts, claiming unpaid salaries. While Pinto was successfully resigned with a pay increase, both Sousa and Pacheco never went back on their decision, subsequently moving to Lisbon rivals Sporting CP.

Sousa had been a frequent starter for Benfica, playing 35 games in the previous season and having joined the club as a 16-year-old. Pacheco was utilized more as a substitute, but had still amassed over 160 league games for Benfica. The players' "betrayal" and the increase in tension between the old rivals was labelled "Hot Summer of 1993", a clever throwback to the troubled times of the PREC, the post revolution in 1975.

With almost no new signings, and having lost Sousa, Pacheco and Paulo Futre, the team led by Toni was not seen as favourite in the title race. The season opened with the 1993 Supertaça Cândido de Oliveira, and with a win for both sides, a third match would be necessary. In the league, Benfica started by sharing points with Porto in O Clássico, but then tied again against much easier opponents, like Estoril and Beira-Mar; both clubs that played a crucial role in the previous season's title race. On the late part of September, the first win in the Primeira Liga kick-started a series of consecutive wins that helped the club climb from eighth in the league to first. A big loss in Setúbal served as warning, with the Lisbon-side then adding more consecutive wins, opening a three-point gap by the New Year.

In the first month of 1994, the club lost points against Gil Vicente and was eliminated from the Taça de Portugal by Belenenses, though this was not enough to stop their momentum, continuing to defend their first place with consecutive wins. In early March, with successive draws in the league and a hard-fought 4–4 draw in the quarter-finals of the Cup Winners' Cup, the club look like would be surpass by Sporting on the title race, with the distance now reduced to just one point. A loss against Salgueiros in April put both clubs equal on points, while in the European stage, the club was defeated by Parma in the semi-finals.

Benfica entered the Derby de Lisboa on 14 May with just a one-point advantage in the league table, knowing that a loss would cost them first place. João Pinto had one of his best performances with Benfica, scoring a hat-trick that effectively ended the title race in his club's favour. Only a few days later, away against Braga, the club secured its 30th league title, celebrating with the fans at the sold out Estádio Primeiro de Maio.

Carlos Mozer, an undisputed starter during the season, narrated the events in the club almanac: "We won the title with great difficulty, because Sporting had a young but good team, while Porto had the experience. At Benfica, our squad was strong. There were veterans like William, Veloso and Isaías, that taught the younger ones, like Rui Costa or João Pinto; who still had the will and pace to run all game. The coach was Toni, who I knew back from 1989. Benfica did not start well, and amassed three straight draws. Then he started winning in a awful manner. We did not play well, but we were winning games, until the notorious game in Alvalade, the 6–3. Everybody said that Sporting was going to win, because they had a younger team, and we were older; so we would not endure the difficult terrain. When everything looked like to be on their favour; we, with great calm and experience, reversed the game with a great performance from João Pinto. In that season, I also remember the campaign in the Cup Winners' Cup. We reach the semi-finals, after that crazy 4–4 in Leverkusen. We were drawn against Parma, and the Italians were always difficult. We won in the Estádio da Luz, but there, in Italy; I was sent-off early, on the 20th minute, with a double yellow. The first was fair, the second was not. If with eleven players was already hard, with one less, it was even harder."

Competitions

Overall record

Supertaça Cândido de Oliveira

Primeira Divisão

League table

Results by round

Matches

Taça de Portugal

UEFA Cup Winners' Cup

First round

Second round

Quarter-finals

Semi-finals

Friendlies

Player statistics
The squad for the season consisted of the players listed in the tables below, as well as staff member Toni(manager)

|}

Transfers

In

Out

Out by loan

References

Bibliography
 

S.L. Benfica seasons
Benfica
Portuguese football championship-winning seasons